Aliaksei Khadkevich (born 14 January 1994) is a Belarusian handball player. He plays for SKA Minsk and the Belarusian national team.

He competed at the 2016 European Men's Handball Championship.

References

1994 births
Living people
Belarusian male handball players
People from Orsha
Sportspeople from Vitebsk Region